RaySearch Laboratories (AB publ) is a Swedish medical technology company that develops software used in radiation therapy of cancer. The company markets its products worldwide and has subsidiaries in the US, Singapore, Belgium, France, Germany and the UK.

RaySearch markets the RayStation treatment planning system and its products are also distributed through licensing agreements with medical technology companies including Accuray, Mevion, Philips, Nucletron, IBA, Varian and Brainlab.

RaySearch is a public company listed on the Nasdaq Stockholm stock exchange. Effective on 4 January 2016, RaySearch series B share (RAY B) was moved from the Small Cap to the Mid Cap segment of Nasdaq Stockholm, which is the segment for companies with a market value between EUR 150 million and EUR 1 billion.

History 

RaySearch was established in 2000 as a spin-off from Karolinska Institutet in Stockholm. Founder and CEO Johan Löf started the company based on knowledge acquired during his PhD work on radiation treatment of moving tumors at Karolinska Institutet in Stockholm, Sweden. A few months after its establishment, RaySearch entered into a partnership agreement with Philips Medical Systems, which resulted in the development of the P3 IMRT module of the Pinnacle treatment planning system in 2001.

In 2003, RaySearch was listed on the O-list of the Stockholm Stock Exchange, which has been part of Nasdaq since 2008. Between 2004 and 2007, RaySearch entered into partnership agreements with Nucletron, IBA Dosimetry, TomoTherapy and Varian Medical Systems. RaySearch algorithms were adopted for use in several of the leading radiation therapy treatment planning systems.

RaySearch also began engaging in clinical research collaborations, notably working with Princess Margaret Hospital, Canada, and Massachusetts General Hospital, US, to pioneer adaptive therapy and multi-criteria optimization.

In 2008, RaySearch made the decision to develop and market its own treatment planning system. The RayStation system was launched in 2009, and West German Proton Therapy Center Essen placed the first order in the same year.

RayStation received US FDA 510(k) clearance in 2010 and Massachusetts General Hospital subsequently placed the first US order for the system. The first patient treatment with RayStation took place in 2011 at Massachusetts General Hospital.

The first complete version of RayStation was released in 2012, and RayStation was approved for sale in China in 2013.

Current products

RayStation 

RayStation is a treatment planning system for radiation therapy of cancer. The system supports several treatment techniques, including:
    3D-CRT
    Electron therapy
    IMRT
    Helical Tomotherapy
    VMAT
    Proton therapy
    Carbon-ion therapy
    Adaptive radiation therapy

References

External links 

 Official website

Medical technology companies of Sweden
Swedish brands